Nomia lyonsiae is a species of bee in the family Halictidae. It occurs in Australia and Polynesia.

References

lyonsiae
Insects described in 1912